Loughermore is a townland of 142 acres in County Antrim, Northern Ireland. It is situated in the civil parish of Grange of Nilteen and the historic barony of Antrim Upper.

See also 
List of townlands in County Antrim

References

Townlands of County Antrim
Civil parish of Grange of Nilteen